UkrFerry Shipping Company is a ferry operator at the Black Sea, with ferry services serving Ukraine, Bulgaria, Turkey, and Georgia. The company's fleet consists of four ship type RORO and ROPAX generally with 34,000 DWT.

Routes 

 Chornomorsk - Batumi: Greifswald
 Kerch - Poti: Heroes of Shipka, Heroes of Pleven, Heroes of Odessa, Heroes of Sevastopol
 Chornomorsk - Derince: Heroes of Shipka, Heroes of Pleven
 Chornomorsk - Varna: Heroes of Shipka, Heroes of Pleven, Heroes of Odessa, Heroes of Sevastopol
 Varna - Batumi: Heroes of Shipka, Heroes of Pleven, Heroes of Odessa, Heroes of Sevastopol
 Odessa - Istanbul: Caledonia (route suspended since 2010)
 Chornomorsk - Haydarpaşa

Fleet

Current ships 
Two out of three ships are owned by the Danish DFDS. All ships built at the Mathias-Thesen Werft in Wismar as EGF-321 class ferries.

References

External links 
 UkrFerry - Official site
 Caledonia - Official site of the UkrFerry Caledonia
 
 UkrFerry - Company Profile on Maritime Zone

Ferry companies of Ukraine
Companies based in Odesa
Ferries